Shekhar Chatterjee (1924–1990) was an Indian actor and film director.

Career
Chatterjee was born in Kolkata in 1924. He began his career in the Bengali theatre in the 1950s. He was associated with a number of leftist theatre groups, including the Communist Party's Indian People's Theatre Association, Utpal Dutt's Little Theatre Group, and Joan Littlewood's Theatre Workshop, as well as his own group, Theatre Unit, which he formed in 1958. As a stage actor he was well known for his Shakespearean roles and for playing Shardul Singh in Dutt's 1965 play Kallol. His directorial work focused on works by German-language playwrights Bertold Brecht, Friedrich Dürrenmatt, Peter Handke, and Franz Xaver Kroetz. Chatterjee's Brecht productions were rarely adapted to a local setting, and while critics unanimously praised this approach as "authentic", his colleague Dutt attacked it for failing to communicate Brecht's political symbolism to an Indian audience.

Chatterjee was also active in Bengali, Indian and world cinema, having acted in nearly a hundred films by the time he was sixty. Among his first credited roles was in Agradoot's 1955 film noir Sabar Uparey; he later had memorable roles in several of Mrinal Sen's films, including Bhuvan Shome, Ek Adhuri Kahani, Chorus, and Mrigayaa. His biggest international role was that of Huseyn Shaheed Suhrawardy in Richard Attenborough's biographical epic Gandhi. Casting director Dolly Thakore recommended Chatterjee for the role after seeing him onstage in Calcutta and noting that he shared Suhrawardy's large stature.

In 1983, Chatterjee directed the film Vasundhara, which was awarded as best Bengali film at the 31st National Film Awards. The Directorate of Film Festivals cited it for "its sincere attempt to depict the struggle against social injustice".

Filmography

As actor

As director

As screenwriter

References

External links

1920s births
1990 deaths
20th-century Indian male actors
Bengali male actors
Bengali theatre personalities
Film directors from Kolkata
Indian male film actors
Indian male stage actors
Indian People's Theatre Association people
Indian theatre directors
Male actors from Kolkata
Male actors in Bengali cinema
Male actors in Hindi cinema
Male Shakespearean actors
Recipients of the Sangeet Natak Akademi Award